The Pennsylvania State Game Lands Number 37 (SGL 31) are Pennsylvania State Game Lands in Tioga County in Pennsylvania in the United States that provide hunting, bird watching, and other activities.

Geography
State Game Lands Number 37 is located in Charleston, Middlebury, Richmond, Rutland and Tioga Townships, in Tioga County. Nearby recreational and protected areas include Cowanesque Lake to the north, Smythe Park to the southeast in Mansfield, and Hills Creek State Park to the southwest.

Statistics

References

036
Protected areas of Tioga County, Pennsylvania